"The Hard Way" is a song written and recorded by American country music artist Mary Chapin Carpenter. It was released in March 1993 as the fourth single from her album Come On Come On.  The song reached number 11 on the Billboard Hot Country Singles & Tracks chart in July 1993. It was nominated at the 36th Grammy Awards for Best Country Song.

Background
The song became the de facto theme song of the 1993 CBS television special Women of Country, which closed with a performance of the song featuring Carpenter and the rest of the special's all-star cast of female country entertainers.

Personnel
Mary Chapin Carpenter–acoustic guitar, vocals
Jon Caroll–synthesizer
Denny Dadmun-Bixby–bass guitar
John Jennings–electric guitar and background vocals
Matt Rollings–piano
Robbie Magruder–drums
Indigo Girls (Amy Ray and Emily Saliers) and Shawn Colvin–background vocals

Chart performance

References

1993 singles
Mary Chapin Carpenter songs
Columbia Records singles
Songs written by Mary Chapin Carpenter
1992 songs